Doro Live was the first official live album by German hard rock singer Doro Pesch, recorded during the Angels Never Die tour in Germany and released by Vertigo in 1993. The VHS Doro Live '93 was released at the same time only in Europe. It was filmed during two concerts in Germany on 6 and 7 October 1993 and contains two more songs: "The Fortuneteller" and "East Meets West".

Track listing

Credits
Doro Pesch – vocals
Joe Taylor – lead electric and acoustic guitars, backing vocals
Jimmy DiLella – electric and acoustic guitars, keyboards, backing vocals
Nick Douglas – bass, keyboards, backing vocals
Johnny Dee – drums

References

External links
American site

Doro (musician) live albums
1993 live albums
1993 video albums
Doro (musician) video albums
Vertigo Records live albums
Live video albums
Vertigo Records video albums